You Ho-jeong (born January 24, 1969) is a South Korean actress. She made her acting debut in 1991 and has been starring in television and film since. Roles include a divorcee whose husband lives next door in daily drama Definitely Neighbors (2010), and the grown-up protagonist in box office hit Sunny (2011).

In 2013, Yoo became the host of her first ever variety show, the healthy food and lifestyle program Olive Show on cable channel O'live TV.

Filmography

Television series

Film

Variety show

Bibliography

Awards and nominations

References

External links
 
 
 

20th-century South Korean actresses
21st-century South Korean actresses
South Korean television actresses
South Korean film actresses
1969 births
Living people
SM Entertainment artists
Actresses from Seoul
Seoul Institute of the Arts alumni